The Cottonwood River (Dakota: Wáǧa Ožú Wakpá) is a tributary of the Minnesota River,  long, in southwestern Minnesota in the United States. The river's name is a translation of the Dakota name for the river, Wáǧa Ožú Wakpá, for the cottonwood tree groves, which are common along prairie rivers. It has also been known historically as the Big Cottonwood River.

The Cottonwood River flows generally eastwardly throughout its course. It rises southwest of Balaton in Rock Lake Township in southern Lyon County, as an intermittent stream on the Coteau des Prairies, a morainic plateau dividing the Mississippi and Missouri River watersheds. It enters a wooded valley near its mouth, flowing through Flandrau State Park and entering the Minnesota River just southeast of New Ulm. The river was formerly dammed to form a lake in the state park, but the dam was not rebuilt after being washed out by floods in 1965 and 1969.

Due to the northeastward slope of the Coteau des Prairies and the presence of a terminal moraine along the northern side of the river, very few tributaries enter the Cottonwood River from the north.

Approximately 84% of land in the Cottonwood River watershed is used for agriculture; the predominant crops are corn and soybeans.  Wetlands in the watershed have been extensively drained, and fewer than  remain.

Flow rate
The highest recorded flow during the period was 28,700 ft³/s (813 m³/s) on April 10, 1969. The lowest recorded flow was 0.5 ft³/s (0 m³/s) on November 27, 1952.

See also
List of rivers of Minnesota
List of longest streams of Minnesota
Little Cottonwood River

References

Rivers of Minnesota
Tributaries of the Minnesota River
Rivers of Brown County, Minnesota
Rivers of Cottonwood County, Minnesota
Rivers of Lyon County, Minnesota
Rivers of Redwood County, Minnesota
New Ulm, Minnesota